In the mathematical field of graph theory, the Laplacian matrix, also called the graph Laplacian, admittance matrix, Kirchhoff matrix or discrete Laplacian, is a matrix representation of a graph. Named after Pierre-Simon Laplace, the graph Laplacian matrix can be viewed as a matrix form of the negative discrete Laplace operator on a graph approximating the negative continuous Laplacian obtained by the finite difference method.

The Laplacian matrix relates to many useful properties of a graph. Together with Kirchhoff's theorem, it can be used to calculate the number of spanning trees for a given graph.  The sparsest cut of a graph can be approximated through the Fiedler vector — the eigenvector corresponding to the second smallest eigenvalue of the graph Laplacian — as established by Cheeger's inequality. The spectral decomposition of the Laplacian matrix allows constructing low dimensional embeddings that appear in many machine learning applications and determines a spectral layout in graph drawing. Graph-based signal processing is based on the graph Fourier transform that extends the traditional discrete Fourier transform by substituting the standard basis of complex sinusoids for eigenvectors of the Laplacian matrix of a graph corresponding to the signal.

The Laplacian matrix is the easiest to define for a simple graph, but more common in applications for an edge-weighted graph, i.e., with weights on its edges — the entries of the graph adjacency matrix. Spectral graph theory relates properties of a graph to a spectrum, i.e., eigenvalues, and eigenvectors of matrices associated with the graph, such as its adjacency matrix or Laplacian matrix. Imbalanced weights may undesirably affect the matrix spectrum, leading to the need of normalization — a column/row scaling of the matrix entries — resulting in normalized adjacency and Laplacian matrices.

Definitions for simple graphs

Laplacian matrix 
Given a simple graph  with  vertices , its Laplacian matrix  is 
defined element-wise as
 
or equivalently by the matrix 
 

where D is the degree matrix and A is the adjacency matrix of the graph. Since  is a simple graph,  only contains 1s or 0s and its diagonal elements are all 0s.

Here is a simple example of a labelled, undirected graph and its Laplacian matrix.

We observe for the undirected graph that both the adjacency matrix and the Laplacian matrix are symmetric, and that row- and column-sums of the Laplacian matrix are all zeros.

For directed graphs, either the indegree or outdegree might be used, depending on the application, as in the following example:

In the directed graph, both the adjacency matrix and the Laplacian matrix are asymmetric. In its Laplacian matrix, column-sums or row-sums are zero, depending on whether the indegree or outdegree has been used.

Symmetric Laplacian via the incidence matrix 

Even though the edges in this definition are technically directed, their directions can be arbitrary, still resulting in the same symmetric Laplacian  matrix L defined as

where  is the matrix transpose of B.

An alternative product  defines the so-called  edge-based Laplacian, as opposed to the original commonly used vertex-based Laplacian matrix L.

Symmetric Laplacian for a directed graph
The Laplacian matrix of a directed graph is by definition generally non-symmetric, while, e.g., traditional spectral clustering is primarily developed for undirected graphs with symmetric adjacency and Laplacian matrices. A trivial approach to apply techniques requiring the symmetry is to turn the original directed graph into an undirected graph and build the Laplacian matrix for the latter. 

Laplacian matrix normalization 
A vertex with a large degree, also called a heavy node, results in a large diagonal entry in the Laplacian matrix dominating the matrix properties. Normalization is aimed to make the influence of such vertices more equal to that of other vertices, by dividing the entries of the Laplacian matrix by the vertex degrees. To avoid division by zero, isolated vertices with zero degrees are excluded from the process of the normalization.

Symmetrically normalized Laplacian 

The symmetrically normalized Laplacian matrix is defined as:

 
where  is the Moore–Penrose inverse.

The symmetrically normalized Laplacian matrix is symmetric if and only if the adjacency matrix is symmetric. 

For a non-symmetric adjacency matrix of a directed graph, either of indegree and outdegree can be used for normalization:

Left (random-walk) and right normalized Laplacians 

The left (random-walk) normalized Laplacian matrix is defined as:
 
where  is the Moore–Penrose inverse.

Similarly, the right normalized Laplacian matrix is defined as 
 .

The left or right normalized Laplacian matrix is not symmetric if the adjacency matrix is symmetric, except for the trivial case of all isolated vertices. For example, 

The example also demonstrates that if  has no isolated vertices, then  right stochastic and hence is the matrix of a random walk, so that the left normalized Laplacian  has each row summing to zero. Thus we sometimes alternatively call  the random-walk normalized Laplacian. In the less uncommonly used right normalized Laplacian  each column sums to zero since  is left stochastic. 

For a non-symmetric adjacency matrix of a directed graph, one also needs to choose indegree or outdegree for normalization:

The left out-degree normalized Laplacian with row-sums all 0 relates to right stochastic  , while the right in-degree normalized Laplacian  with column-sums all 0 contains left stochastic  .

Definitions for graphs with weighted edges 
Common in applications graphs with weighted edges are conveniently defined by their adjacency matrices where values of the entries are numeric and no longer limited to zeros and ones. In spectral clustering and graph-based signal processing, where graph vertices represent data points, the edge weights can be computed, e.g., as inversely proportional to the distances between pairs of data points, leading to all weights being non-negative with larger values informally corresponding to more similar pairs of data points. Using correlation and anti-correlation between the data points naturally leads to both positive and negative weights. Most definitions for simple graphs are trivially extended to the standard case of non-negative weights, while negative weights require more attention, especially in normalization.

Laplacian matrix 
The Laplacian matrix is defined by
 

where D is the degree matrix and A is the adjacency matrix of the graph. 

For directed graphs, either the indegree or outdegree might be used, depending on the application, as in the following example:

Graph self-loops, manifesting themselves by non-zero entries on the main diagonal of the adjacency matrix, are allowed but do not affect the graph Laplacian values.

Symmetric Laplacian via the incidence matrix 

An alternative cleaner approach, described here, is to separate the weights from the connectivity: continue using the incidence matrix as for regular graphs and introduce a matrix just holding the values of the weights. A spring system is an example of this model used in mechanics to describe a system of springs of given stiffnesses and unit length, where the values of the stiffnesses play the role of the weights of the graph edges.

We now also define a diagonal  matrix W containing the edge weights. Even though the edges in the definition of B are technically directed, their directions can be arbitrary, still resulting in the same symmetric Laplacian  matrix L defined as

where  is the matrix transpose of B.

The construction is illustrated in the following example, where every edge  is assigned the weight value i, with

Symmetric Laplacian for a directed graph
Just like for simple graphs, the Laplacian matrix of a directed weighted graph is by definition generally non-symmetric. The symmetry can be enforced by turning the original directed graph into an undirected graph first before constructing the Laplacian. The adjacency matrix of the undirected graph could, e.g., be defined as a sum of the adjacency matrix  of the original directed graph and its matrix transpose  as in the following example:

Alternatively, the symmetric Laplacian matrix can be calculated from the two Laplacians using the indegree and outdegree, as in the following example:

The sum of the out-degree Laplacian transposed and the in-degree Laplacian equals to the symmetric Laplacian matrix.

Laplacian matrix normalization
The goal of normalization is, like for simple graphs, to make the diagonal entries of the Laplacian matrix to be all unit, also scaling off-diagonal entries correspondingly. In a  weighted graph, a vertex may have a large degree because of a small number of connected edges but with large weights just as well as due to a large number of connected edges with unit weights.

Graph self-loops, i.e., non-zero entries on the main diagonal of the adjacency matrix, do not affect the graph Laplacian values, but may need to be counted for calculation of the normalization factors.

Symmetrically normalized Laplacian 

The symmetrically normalized Laplacian is defined as
 

Since the degree matrix D is diagonal, its reciprocal square root  is just the diagonal matrix whose diagonal entries are the reciprocals of the square roots of the diagonal entries of D. If all the edge weights are nonnegative then all the degree values are automatically also nonnegative and so every degree value has a unique positive square root. To avoid the division by zero, vertices with zero degrees are excluded from the process of the normalization, as in the following example:

The symmetrically normalized Laplacian is a symmetric matrix if and only if the adjacency matrix A is symmetric and the diagonal entries of D are nonnegative, in which case we can use the term the symmetric normalized Laplacian.

The symmetric normalized Laplacian matrix can be also written as 
 
using the weightless  incidence matrix B and the diagonal  matrix W containing the edge weights and defining the new  weighted incidence matrix  whose rows are indexed by the vertices and whose columns are indexed by the edges of G such that each column corresponding to an edge e = {u, v} has an entry  in the row corresponding to u, an entry  in the row corresponding to v, and has 0 entries elsewhere.

Random walk normalized Laplacian 

The random walk normalized Laplacian is defined as
 

where D is the degree matrix. Since the degree matrix D is diagonal, its inverse  is simply defined as a diagonal matrix, having diagonal entries which are the reciprocals of the corresponding diagonal entries of D. For the isolated vertices (those with degree 0), a common choice is to set the corresponding element  to 0.
 

For example, let  denote the i-th standard basis vector. Then  is a probability vector representing the distribution of a random walker's locations after taking a single step from vertex ; i.e., . More generally, if the vector  is a probability distribution of the location of a random walker on the vertices of the graph, then  is the probability distribution of the walker after  steps.

The random walk normalized Laplacian can also be called the left normalized Laplacian  since the normalization is performed by multiplying the Laplacian by the normalization matrix  on the left. It has each row summing to zero since  is right stochastic, assuming all the weights are non-negative.

In the less uncommonly used right normalized Laplacian  each column sums to zero since  is left stochastic. 

For a non-symmetric adjacency matrix of a directed graph, one also needs to choose indegree or outdegree for normalization:

The left out-degree normalized Laplacian with row-sums all 0 relates to right stochastic  , while the right in-degree normalized Laplacian  with column-sums all 0 contains left stochastic  .

Negative weights
Negative weights present several challenges for normalisation:
 The presence of negative weights may naturally result in zero row- and/or column-sums for non-isolated vertices. A vertex with a large row-sum of positive weights and equally negatively large row-sum of negative weights, together summing up to zero, could be considered a heavy node and both large values scaled, while the diagonal entry remains zero, like for a isolated vertex. 
 Negative weights may also give negative row- and/or column-sums, so that the corresponding diagonal entry in the non-normalized Laplacian matrix would be negative and a positive square root needed for the symmetric normalization would not exist. 
 Arguments can be made to take the absolute value of the row- and/or column-sums for the purpose of normalization, thus treating a possible value -1 as a legitimate unit entry of the main diagonal of the normalized Laplacian matrix.

Properties 
For an (undirected) graph G and its Laplacian matrix L with eigenvalues :

 L is symmetric.
This can be seen from the fact that the Laplacian is symmetric and diagonally dominant.
 L is an M-matrix (its off-diagonal entries are nonpositive, yet the real parts of its eigenvalues are nonnegative).
 Every row sum and column sum of L is zero. Indeed, in the sum, the degree of the vertex is summed with a "−1" for each neighbor.
 In consequence, because the vector  satisfies  This also implies that the Laplacian matrix is singular.
 The number of connected components in the graph is the dimension of the nullspace of the Laplacian and the algebraic multiplicity of the 0 eigenvalue.
 The smallest non-zero eigenvalue of L is called the spectral gap.
 The second smallest eigenvalue of L (could be zero) is the algebraic connectivity (or Fiedler value) of G and approximates the sparsest cut of a graph.
 When G is k-regular, the normalized Laplacian is: , where A is the adjacency matrix and I is an identity matrix.
 For a graph with multiple connected components, L is a block diagonal matrix, where each block is the respective Laplacian matrix for each component, possibly after reordering the vertices (i.e. L is permutation-similar to a block diagonal matrix).
 The trace of the Laplacian matrix L is equal to  where  is the number of edges of the considered graph.

 All eigenvalues of the normalized symmetric Laplacian satisfy 0 = μ0 ≤ … ≤ μn−1 ≤ 2. These eigenvalues (known as the spectrum of the normalized Laplacian) relate well to other graph invariants for general graphs.

 One can check that:
 ,

i.e.,  is  similar to the normalized Laplacian . For this reason, even if  is in general not symmetric, it has real eigenvalues — exactly the same as the eigenvalues of the normalized symmetric Laplacian .

Interpretation as the discrete Laplace operator approximating the continuous Laplacian
The graph Laplacian matrix can be further viewed as a matrix form of the negative discrete Laplace operator on a graph approximating the negative continuous Laplacian operator obtained by the finite difference method.
(See Discrete Poisson equation) In this interpretation, every graph vertex is treated as a grid point; the local connectivity of the vertex determines the finite difference approximation stencil at this grid point, the grid size is always one for every edge, and there are no constraints on any grid points, which corresponds to the case of the homogeneous Neumann boundary condition, i.e., free boundary. Such an interpretation allows one, e.g., generalizing the Laplacian matrix to the case of graphs with an infinite number of vertices and edges, leading to a Laplacian matrix of an infinite size.

Generalizations and extensions of the Laplacian matrix

Generalized Laplacian 
The generalized Laplacian  is defined as:
 

Notice the ordinary Laplacian is a generalized Laplacian.

Magnetic Laplacian 
Entries of the adjacency matrix can be complex-valued, in which case the notion of the matrix symmetry needs to be replaced with a Hermitian matrix. Magnetic Laplacian for a directed graph with real weights   is constructed  as the Hadamard product of the real symmetric matrix of the symmetrized Laplacian and the Hermitian phase matrix with the complex entries

which encode the edge direction into the phase in the complex plane.
In the context of quantum physics, the magnetic Laplacian can be interpreted as the operator that describes the phenomenology of a free charged particle on a graph, which is subject to the action of a magnetic field and the parameter   is called electric charge.
In the following example :

Deformed Laplacian 

The deformed Laplacian is commonly defined as

where I is the identity matrix, A is the adjacency matrix, D is the degree matrix, and s is a (complex-valued) number.

Signless Laplacian 
The signless Laplacian is defined as

Like the signed Laplacian , the signless Laplacian  also is positive semi-definite as it can be factored as

where  is the incidence matrix.  has a 0-eigenvector if and only if it has a bipartite connected component other than isolated vertices. This can be shown as

This has a solution where  if and only if the graph has a bipartite connected component.

Directed multigraphs 
An analogue of the Laplacian matrix can be defined for directed multigraphs. In this case the Laplacian matrix L is defined as

where D is a diagonal matrix with Di,i equal to the outdegree of vertex i and A is a matrix with Ai,j equal to the number of edges from i to j (including loops).

Open source software implementations 
 SciPy
 NetworkX

Application software 
 scikit-learn Spectral Clustering
 PyGSP: Graph Signal Processing in Python
 megaman: Manifold Learning for Millions of Points
 smoothG
 Laplacian Change Point Detection for Dynamic Graphs (KDD 2020)
 LaplacianOpt (A Julia Package for Maximizing Laplacian's Second Eigenvalue of Weighted Graphs) 
 LigMG (Large Irregular Graph MultiGrid)
 Laplacians.jl

See also 
Stiffness matrix
Resistance distance
Transition rate matrix
Calculus on finite weighted graphs
Graph Fourier transform

References 

Algebraic graph theory
Matrices
Numerical differential equations